Michał Olszewski (born 1989 in Warsaw) is a Polish chess player holding the title of Grandmaster.
He won the bronze medal at the 2009 World Junior Chess Championship played in Argentina.

References

External links

1989 births
Living people
Sportspeople from Warsaw
Polish chess players
Chess grandmasters